The 1985 Chicago Marathon was the 9th running of the annual marathon race in Chicago, United States and was held on October 20. The elite men's race was won by Britain's Steve Jones in a time of 2:07:13 hours and the women's race was won by America's Joan Samuelson in 2:21:21. A total of 7562 runners finished the race, an increase of over 1700 from the previous year.

Results

Men 
{| class="wikitable sortable"
! Position 
! Athlete 
! Nationality
! Time
|- bgcolor=#F7F6A8
|align=center|  || Steve Jones ||  || 2:07:13
|- bgcolor=#DCE5E5
|align=center|  || Djama Robleh ||  || 2:08:08
|- bgcolor=#FFDAB9
|align=center|  || Robert de Castella ||  || 2:08:48
|-
|align=center| 4 || Gianni Poli ||  || 2:09:57
|-
|align=center| 5 || Ralf Salzmann ||  || 2:10:56
|-
|align=center| 6 || José Gómez ||  || 2:11:08
|-
|align=center| 7 || Don Janicki ||  || 2:11:16
|-
|align=center| 8 || Francisco Pacheco ||  || 2:11:57
|-
|align=center| 9 || Ken Martin ||  || 2:12:00
|-
|align=center| 10 || Henrik Jørgensen ||  || 2:12:03
|-
|align=center| 11 || Allister Hutton ||  || 2:12:28
|-
|align=center| 12 || John Graham ||  || 2:12:55
|-
|align=center| 13 || Mats Erixon ||  || 2:13:29
|-
|align=center| 14 || Bill Donakowski ||  || 2:14:07
|-
|align=center| 15 || David Olds ||  || 2:14:19
|-
|align=center| 16 || Jean-Pierre Paumen ||  || 2:14:25
|-
|align=center| 17 || Gianni Demadonna ||  || 2:14:30
|-
|align=center| 18 || Craig Holm ||  || 2:14:43
|-
|align=center| 19 || Kurt Hürst ||  || 2:14:49
|-
|align=center| 20 || Agapius Masong ||  || 2:14:54
|-
|align=center| — || Mark Curp ||  || 
|-
|align=center| — || David Gordon ||  || 
|-
|align=center| — || Simon Kigen ||  || 
|-
|align=center| — || Martín Pitayo ||  ||

Women

References

Results. Association of Road Racing Statisticians. Retrieved 2020-05-25.

External links 
 Official website

1985
Chicago
1980s in Chicago
1985 in Illinois
Chicago Marathon
Chicago Marathon